Tanyong Mat railway station is a railway station located in Tanyong Mat Subdistrict, Ra-ngae District, Narathiwat, Thailand. The station is a class 1 railway station located 1099.503 km from Thon Buri railway station. Tanyong Mat opened in March 1920, as part of the Southern Line Balo-Tanyong Mat section.

In July 2014, 2 bombs wents off in the vicinity of the railway station, one in a trashcan in front of the station, and one near a clock tower nearby. This event was part of the separatist attacks of the South Thailand Insurgency.

Train services 
 Thaksin Special Express; train No. 37 / 38 Bangkok - Sungai Kolok - Bangkok
 Rapid train No. 171 / 172 Bangkok - Sungai Kolok - Bangkok
 Rapid train No. 175 / 176 Hat Yai Junction - Sungai Kolok - Hat Yai Junction
 Local train No. 447 / 448 Surat Thani - Sungai Kolok - Surat Thani
 Local train No. 451 / 452 Nakhon Si Thammarat- Sungai Kolok- Nakhon Si Thammarat
 Local train No. 453 / 454 Yala - Sungai Kolok - Yala
 Local train No. 463 / 464 Phatthalung-Sungai Kolok-Phatthalung

References 
 
 
 

Railway stations opened in 1920
Railway stations in Thailand